The ADM-141A/B TALD was an American decoy missile originally built by Brunswick Corporation for the United States Air Force and the Israeli Air Force.  Later it transitioned to joint US/Israeli manufacture with Israeli Military Industries Advanced Systems Division (IMI-ASD).

The Tactical Air Launched Decoy (TALD) was intended to confuse and saturate enemy air defenses, as part of an overall SEAD (Suppression of Enemy Air Defenses) strategy, thus allowing attacking aircraft and weapons a higher probability of penetrating to the target. The Improved TALD is a turbojet-powered version.

History
In the 1970s, the Brunswick Corp. developed several unpowered radar decoys, including the Samson, which was produced for the Israeli Air Force by Israel Military Industries (IMI) in the early 1980s. The Samson proved highly successful, prompting the US Navy to purchase about 2000 of them during the mid to late 1980s. The first units entered US service in 1987; in 1985, Brunswick was asked to develop an improved Samson named TALD.

The TALD was an expendable glide vehicle with a square fuselage, flip-out wings, and three tail control surfaces. A digital flight control system could be programmed to conduct various speed or maneuvering changes during flight.

Variants

The TALD was built in different versions.

ADM-141A
The ADM-141A has passive and active radar enhancers. An IR addon was fielded for a while, but was later withdrawn from service.

ADM-141B
The ADM-141B carries a 36 kg (80 lb) payload of chaff.

ADM-141C ITALD

The ADM-141C (ITALD) has the same passive and active radar enhancers as the ADM-141A TALD.

Operations
The TALD was used with great success in the opening stages of Operation Desert Storm in 1991, with the first being deployed in combat by Lt. Jeff Greer. More than 100 were launched on the opening night of the war. This prompted the Iraqi air defense to activate many of its radars, most of which were then destroyed by anti-radiation missiles.

The Improved TALD is powered by a Teledyne CAE Model 312 (J700-CA-400) turbojet. This model was also capable of performing a flight profile resembling that of a real aircraft much more convincingly. Initially 20 TALDs were upgraded to ADM-141C ITALD configuration, with the first flight conducted in 1996. Since then the U.S. Navy has ordered over 200 ADM-141Cs.

The major user of the ADM-141 is the F/A-18 Hornet.

Up to 6 decoys can be carried on a single stores pylon, using a pair of triple ejector racks.

Specifications
 Length: 2.34 m (7 ft 8 in)
 Wingspan: 1.55 m (5 ft 1 in)
 Weight: 180 kg (400 lb)
 Speed: up to Mach 0.8 (460 km/h, 250 kn)
 Range: 126 km (78 mi), over 300 km (185 mi) for the ADM-141C
 Propulsion: Teledyne CAE J700-CA-400 turbojet, 790 N (177 lbf) on ADM-141C only

References
Article source:  Vectorsite's Unmanned Aerial Vehicles by Greg Goebel.

See also
List of missiles
ADM-160 MALD

Decoy missiles of the United States
Military equipment of Israel
Military equipment introduced in the 1980s